Puszyna  is a village in the administrative district of Gmina Korfantów, within Nysa County, Opole Voivodeship, in south-western Poland.

History
The village dates back to the Middle Ages. Within Piast-ruled Poland, it was the location of a motte-and-bailey castle from the 10th-14th century, which is now an archaeological site. In the 18th century, the village was annexed by Prussia, and from 1871 to 1945 it was also part of Germany, before it became again part of Poland following Germany's defeat in World War II.

References

Villages in Nysa County
Archaeological sites in Poland